The 1983 Oklahoma State Cowboys baseball team represented the Oklahoma State University in the 1983 NCAA Division I baseball season. The Cowboys played their home games at Allie P. Reynolds Stadium. The team was coached by Gary Ward in his 6th year at Oklahoma State.

The Cowboys won the Midwest Regional to advance to the College World Series, where they were defeated by the Arizona State Sun Devils.

Roster

Schedule

! style="" | Regular Season
|- valign="top" 

|- bgcolor="#ccffcc"
| 1 || February 26 || at  || Titan Field • Fullerton, California || 7–4 || 1–0 || –
|- bgcolor="#ccffcc"
| 2 || February 28 || at  || Unknown • Las Vegas, Nevada || 18–5 || 2–0 || –
|-

|- bgcolor="#ccffcc"
| 3 || March 1 || at UNLV || Unknown • Las Vegas, Nevada || 9–6 || 3–0 || –
|- bgcolor="#ffcccc"
| 4 || March 4 || at  || Tech Diamond • Lubbock, Texas || 5–7 || 3–1 || –
|- bgcolor="#ffcccc"
| 5 || March 4 || at Texas Tech || Tech Diamond • Lubbock, Texas || 7–8 || 3–2 || –
|- bgcolor="#ccffcc"
| 6 || March 5 || at Texas Tech || Tech Diamond • Lubbock, Texas || 15–4 || 4–2 || –
|- bgcolor="#ffcccc"
| 7 || March 7 || vs  || Unknown • Edinburg, Texas || 5–6 || 4–3 || –
|- bgcolor="#ffcccc"
| 8 || March 7 || at  || Unknown • Edinburg, Texas || 2–9 || 4–4 || –
|- bgcolor="#ccffcc"
| 9 || March 8 || vs  || Unknown • Edinburg, Texas || 9–2 || 5–4 || –
|- bgcolor="#ffcccc"
| 10 || March 9 || vs Arkansas State || Unknown • Edinburg, Texas || 3–4 || 5–5 || –
|- bgcolor="#ccffcc"
| 11 || March 10 || vs  || Unknown • Edinburg, Texas || 17–6 || 6–5 || –
|- bgcolor="#ffcccc"
| 12 || March 11 || vs  || Unknown • Edinburg, Texas || 1–7 || 6–6 || –
|- bgcolor="#ccffcc"
| 13 || March 12 || vs Arkansas State || Unknown • Edinburg, Texas || 6–0 || 7–6 || –
|- bgcolor="#ccffcc"
| 14 || March 16 ||  || Allie P. Reynolds Stadium • Stillwater, Oklahoma || 11–1 || 8–6 || –
|- bgcolor="#ccffcc"
| 15 || March 16 || Texas Wesleyan || Allie P. Reynolds Stadium • Stillwater, Oklahoma || 4–1 || 9–6 || –
|- bgcolor="#ccffcc"
| 16 || March 21 ||  || Allie P. Reynolds Stadium • Stillwater, Oklahoma || 11–1 || 10–6 || –
|- bgcolor="#ccffcc"
| 17 || March 21 || Phillips || Allie P. Reynolds Stadium • Stillwater, Oklahoma || 13–0 || 11–6 || –
|- bgcolor="#ccffcc"
| 18 || March 22 ||  || Allie P. Reynolds Stadium • Stillwater, Oklahoma || 7–6 || 12–6 || –
|- bgcolor="#ccffcc"
| 19 || March 22 || Missouri Southern || Allie P. Reynolds Stadium • Stillwater, Oklahoma || 11–1 || 13–6 || –
|- bgcolor="#ccffcc"
| 20 || March 24 ||  || Allie P. Reynolds Stadium • Stillwater, Oklahoma || 11–3 || 14–6 || –
|- bgcolor="#ccffcc"
| 21 || March 27 ||  || Allie P. Reynolds Stadium • Stillwater, Oklahoma || 4–1 || 15–6 || –
|- bgcolor="#ccffcc"
| 22 || March 27 || Midwestern State || Allie P. Reynolds Stadium • Stillwater, Oklahoma || 4–0 || 16–6 || –
|- bgcolor="#ccffcc"
| 23 || March 28 || Midwestern State || Allie P. Reynolds Stadium • Stillwater, Oklahoma || 8–7 || 17–6 || –
|- bgcolor="#ccffcc"
| 24 || March 28 || Midwestern State || Allie P. Reynolds Stadium • Stillwater, Oklahoma || 6–4 || 18–6 || –
|-

|- bgcolor="#ffcccc"
| 25 || April 2 ||  || Allie P. Reynolds Stadium • Stillwater, Oklahoma || 7–9 || 18–7 || 0–1
|- bgcolor="#ccffcc"
| 26 || April 2 || Oklahoma || Allie P. Reynolds Stadium • Stillwater, Oklahoma || 15–14 || 19–7 || 1–1
|- bgcolor="#ffcccc"
| 27 || April 3 || Oklahoma || Allie P. Reynolds Stadium • Stillwater, Oklahoma || 1–6 || 19–8 || 1–2
|- bgcolor="#ffcccc"
| 28 || April 3 || Oklahoma || Allie P. Reynolds Stadium • Stillwater, Oklahoma || 7–11 || 19–9 || 1–3
|- bgcolor="#ccffcc"
| 29 || April 11 || at  || KSU Baseball Stadium • Manhattan, Kansas || 13–0 || 20–9 || 2–3
|- bgcolor="#ccffcc"
| 30 || April 11 || at Kansas State || KSU Baseball Stadium • Manhattan, Kansas || 9–1 || 21–9 || 3–3
|- bgcolor="#ffcccc"
| 31 || April 15 || at  || J. L. Johnson Stadium • Tulsa, Oklahoma || 2–10 || 21–10 || 3–3
|- bgcolor="#ccffcc"
| 32 || April 16 || Oral Roberts || Allie P. Reynolds Stadium • Stillwater, Oklahoma || 6–5 || 22–10 || 3–3
|- bgcolor="#ffcccc"
| 33 || April 16 || Oral Roberts || Allie P. Reynolds Stadium • Stillwater, Oklahoma || 8–10 || 22–11 || 3–3
|- bgcolor="#ccffcc"
| 34 || April 17 ||  || Allie P. Reynolds Stadium • Stillwater, Oklahoma || 15–6 || 23–11 || 3–3
|- bgcolor="#ffcccc"
| 35 || April 17 || Wichita State || Allie P. Reynolds Stadium • Stillwater, Oklahoma || 1–8 || 23–12 || 3–3
|- bgcolor="#ccffcc"
| 36 || April 19 ||  || Allie P. Reynolds Stadium • Stillwater, Oklahoma || 11–2 || 24–12 || 3–3
|- bgcolor="#ffcccc"
| 37 || April 19 || Arkansas–Little Rock || Allie P. Reynolds Stadium • Stillwater, Oklahoma || 3–5 || 24–13 || 3–3
|- bgcolor="#ccffcc"
| 38 || April 20 || Arkansas–Little Rock || Allie P. Reynolds Stadium • Stillwater, Oklahoma || 4–2 || 25–13 || 3–3
|- bgcolor="#ccffcc"
| 39 || April 20 || Arkansas–Little Rock || Allie P. Reynolds Stadium • Stillwater, Oklahoma || 10–3 || 26–13 || 3–3
|- bgcolor="#ccffcc"
| 40 || April 23 ||  || Allie P. Reynolds Stadium • Stillwater, Oklahoma || 5–1 || 27–13 || 4–3
|- bgcolor="#ccffcc"
| 41 || April 23 || Missouri || Allie P. Reynolds Stadium • Stillwater, Oklahoma || 8–2 || 28–13 || 5–3
|- bgcolor="#ccffcc"
| 42 || April 24 || Missouri || Allie P. Reynolds Stadium • Stillwater, Oklahoma || 13–6 || 29–13 || 6–3
|- bgcolor="#ccffcc"
| 43 || April 24 || Missouri || Allie P. Reynolds Stadium • Stillwater, Oklahoma || 18–8 || 30–13 || 7–3
|- bgcolor="#ccffcc"
| 44 || April 26 || Midwestern State || Allie P. Reynolds Stadium • Stillwater, Oklahoma || 21–7 || 31–13 || 7–3
|- bgcolor="#ccffcc"
| 45 || April 27 || at  || Jim Wade Stadium • Oklahoma City, Oklahoma || 23–6 || 32–13 || 7–3
|-

|- bgcolor="#ccffcc"
| 46 || May 4 || Oklahoma City || Allie P. Reynolds Stadium • Stillwater, Oklahoma || 6–4 || 33–13 || 7–3
|- bgcolor="#ccffcc"
| 47 || May 7 ||  || Allie P. Reynolds Stadium • Stillwater, Oklahoma || 16–4 || 34–13 || 8–3
|- bgcolor="#ccffcc"
| 48 || May 7 || Nebraska || Allie P. Reynolds Stadium • Stillwater, Oklahoma || 5–2 || 35–13 || 9–3
|- bgcolor="#ccffcc"
| 49 || May 8 || Nebraska || Allie P. Reynolds Stadium • Stillwater, Oklahoma || 3–2 || 36–13 || 10–3
|- bgcolor="#ccffcc"
| 50 || May 8 || Nebraska || Allie P. Reynolds Stadium • Stillwater, Oklahoma || 4–1 || 37–13 || 11–3
|-

|-
|-
! style="" | Postseason
|- valign="top" 

|- bgcolor="#ccffcc"
| 51 || May 12 || vs Nebraska || Unknown • Oklahoma City, Oklahoma || 9–6 || 38–13 || 11–3
|- bgcolor="#ccffcc"
| 52 || May 15 || vs Oklahoma || Unknown • Oklahoma City, Oklahoma || 3–1 || 39–13 || 11–3
|- bgcolor="#ccffcc"
| 53 || May 16 || vs Missouri || Unknown • Oklahoma City, Oklahoma || 6–5 || 40–13 || 11–3
|- bgcolor="#ffcccc"
| 54 || May 16 || vs Oklahoma || Unknown • Oklahoma City, Oklahoma || 8–10 || 40–14 || 11–3
|- bgcolor="#ccffcc"
| 55 || May 17 || vs Oklahoma || Unknown • Oklahoma City, Oklahoma || 13–4 || 41–14 || 11–3
|-

|- bgcolor="#ccffcc"
| 56 || May 21 ||  || Allie P. Reynolds Stadium • Stillwater, Oklahoma || 12–4 || 42–14 || 11–3
|- bgcolor="#ccffcc"
| 57 || May 22 || Coastal Carolina || Allie P. Reynolds Stadium • Stillwater, Oklahoma || 2–0 || 43–14 || 11–3
|- bgcolor="#ccffcc"
| 58 || May 22 || Coastal Carolina || Allie P. Reynolds Stadium • Stillwater, Oklahoma || 13–6 || 44–14 || 11–3
|-

|- bgcolor="#ccffcc"
| 59 || May 26 || Wichita State || Allie P. Reynolds Stadium • Stillwater, Oklahoma || 9–2 || 45–14 || 11–3
|- bgcolor="#ccffcc"
| 60 || May 27 || Oral Roberts || Allie P. Reynolds Stadium • Stillwater, Oklahoma || 9–8 || 46–14 || 11–3
|- bgcolor="#ccffcc"
| 61 || May 29 || Oral Roberts || Allie P. Reynolds Stadium • Stillwater, Oklahoma || 10–9 || 47–14 || 11–3
|-

|- bgcolor="#ccffcc"
| 62 || June 3 || vs Stanford || Johnny Rosenblatt Stadium • Omaha, Nebraska || 3–1 || 48–14 || 11–3
|- bgcolor="#ffcccc"
| 63 || June 6 || vs Texas || Johnny Rosenblatt Stadium • Omaha, Nebraska || 5–6 || 48–15 || 11–3
|- bgcolor="#ffcccc"
| 64 || June 8 || vs Arizona State || Johnny Rosenblatt Stadium • Omaha, Nebraska || 5–6 || 48–16 || 11–3
|-

Awards and honors 
Glenn Edwards
All-Big Eight Conference
Third Team All-American American Baseball Coaches Association
Second Team All-American Baseball America

Joe Gorman
Big Eight Conference All-Tournament Team

Pete Incaviglia
Third Team All-American Baseball America
College World Series All-Tournament Team

Tim Knapp
College World Series All-Tournament Team

Dennis Livingston
All-Big Eight Conference
Second Team All-American American Baseball Coaches Association
First Team All-American Baseball America

Steve O'Donnell
Big Eight Conference All-Tournament Team

Eric Schmidt
All-Big Eight Conference
Big Eight Conference All-Tournament Team

Scott Wade
Big Eight Conference All-Tournament Team
Big Eight Conference Tournament MVP

Robbie Wine
All-Big Eight Conference

References

Oklahoma State Cowboys baseball seasons
Oklahoma State Cowboys baseball
College World Series seasons
Oklahoma State
Big Eight Conference baseball champion seasons